Channa Divouvi is a Gabonese beauty pageant titleholder who was crowned Winner Miss Gabon 2012 1st runner-up and she was represented Gabon at Miss International 2012 and Miss Universe 2012. After She designated as Miss Universe Gabon 2012.

Biography
Channa has worked at Libreville International Airport and she took education at Lycée National Leon Mba.

Miss Gabon 2011
Marie Noelle Ada is the first ever representative in Miss Universe beauty pageant in 2012. Channa was 1st runner-up Miss Gabon 2012.

Designations
Channa was appointed as Miss Universe Gabon, since Marie-Noëlle Ada withdrew as Gabon representative at the Miss Universe 2012 due to Marie being unable to attend both the pageant and Miss Gabon 2012.

Miss International 2012
Channa represented Gabon at Miss International 2012 in Okinawa, Japan.

Miss Universe 2012
Gabon is Located in western Africa, it was a French colony until 1960. About 1.5 million people live in the country. 27 beauties of the 9 provinces participated in the Miss Gabon 2012 beauty pageant.

References

External links
1. 

2.http://www.missuniverse.com/members/profile/652761/year:2012

3.https://www.facebook.com/media/set/?set=a.136786603134278.44651.132781446868127&type=3

Living people
People from Ngounié Province
Gabonese beauty pageant winners
Miss International 2012 delegates
Miss Universe 2012 contestants
Gabonese people of Filipino descent
1991 births